John Lorfeld (January 25, 1867 – November 29, 1954) was a farmer, businessman, and politician.

Born in the town of Meeme, Manitowoc County, Wisconsin, Lorfeld and his wife moved to a farm in the town of Centerville, in Manitowoc County. Lorfeld as chairman of the Centerville Town Board and on the Manitowoc County Board of Supervisors. He also served as school clerk on the school board. Lorfeld served in the Wisconsin State Assembly from 1919 to 1923 and 1929 to 1933 and was a Republican. Later, he was a leader of the Wisconsin Progressive Party. In 1918, Lorfeld and wife moved to the village of Cleveland, Wisconsin. Lorfeld was president of the Cleveland State Bank. He also was the village postmaster. Lorfeld died at his home in Cleveland, Wisconsin after a long illness.

Notes

1867 births
1954 deaths
People from Meeme, Wisconsin
Businesspeople from Wisconsin
Farmers from Wisconsin
School board members in Wisconsin
Mayors of places in Wisconsin
County supervisors in Wisconsin
Wisconsin Progressives (1924)
20th-century American politicians
Wisconsin postmasters
People from Centerville, Manitowoc County, Wisconsin
People from Manitowoc County, Wisconsin
American bank presidents
Republican Party members of the Wisconsin State Assembly